Davenport Mountain is a summit in the U.S. state of Georgia.

Davenport Mountain was named after John Davenport, a pioneer citizen of the 1830s.

References

Mountains of Union County, Georgia
Mountains of Georgia (U.S. state)